Leif Selim Segerstam (born 2 March 1944) is a Finnish conductor, composer, violinist, violist and pianist, especially known for writing 352 symphonies as of March 2023, along with other works in his extensive oeuvre.

Segerstam has conducted a variety of orchestras since 1963; mostly American, Australian and European. He is widely known through his recordings, which include the complete symphonies of Blomdahl, Brahms, Mahler, Nielsen, and Sibelius, as well as many works by contemporary composers, such as the American composers John Corigliano and Christopher Rouse, the Finnish composer Einojuhani Rautavaara, Swedish composer Allan Pettersson and the Russian composer Alfred Schnittke.

His contributions to the Finnish music scene, and his vibrant personality, have contributed to his fame. He is well known for his high energy during performances, contributing to the musicality of the orchestra as a whole.

Biography

Leif Segerstam was born on 2 March 1944 in Vaasa, to Selim Segerstam and Viola Maria Kronqvist, into a musical family. Selim made several song books as a living. The Segerstams then moved to Helsinki in 1947. In Leif's time in school, he played the violin and the viola in the Helsinki Youth Orchestra.

Segerstam's debut concert as a violinist was in 1962, and his conducting debut was in 1963, with Rossini's The Barber of Seville, in Tampere. Following the premiere, Segerstram was hired to conduct the Finnish National Opera, and a year later, he conducted the Finnish Radio Symphony Orchestra. He conducted modern works, such as Stravinsky's Symphony of Psalms and Shostakovich's 1st symphony.

Segerstam studied violin, piano and conducting at the Sibelius Academy in Helsinki, and received a diploma in conducting in 1963. He studied conducting as well at the Juilliard School in New York with Jean Morel, and received his postgraduate diploma in 1965.

Segerstam became the conductor, and later on, artistic director of the Stockholm's Royal Opera in 1968 and began working with the German Opera in Berlin as well as the Finnish National Opera in the early 1970s. Segerstam served as chief conductor of the Helsinki Philharmonic Orchestra from 1995 to 2007, and now holds the title of Chief Conductor Emeritus with the orchestra. At the same time, he was chief conductor of the Stockholm's Royal Opera and the Savonlinna Opera Festival in Finland until 2000. He has held positions with numerous other orchestras, including the Danish National Radio Symphony and the Austrian Radio Symphony, and has guest-conducted many orchestras throughout the world including the Chicago Symphony, the Los Angeles Philharmonic, the Toronto Symphony, the Royal Liverpool Philharmonic Orchestra, and the Symphony Orchestra of the State of São Paulo. From autumn 1997 to spring 2013, he was Professor of Orchestra Conducting at the Sibelius Academy in Helsinki. His students include Susanna Mälkki, Mikk Murdvee, Sasha Mäkilä and Markku Laakso.

Compositions
As a composer, he is especially known for his many symphonies, which number 344 as of April 2021. Most of his symphonies last for about 20 minutes, are formed of a single movement and are performed without a conductor. An example of this would be his 37th symphony which at its premiere featured Segerstam at the piano, leading the orchestra "in a relatively free form". This is partially inspired by Sibelius' 7th symphony. More than a hundred of Segerstam's symphonies have been performed.

Many of his compositions are influenced by nature, and he is often praised for his contributions to Nordic Music. He developed a personal approach to aleatory composition through a style called "free pulsation" in which musical events interact flexibly in time, with his composition method persistent throughout his œuvre. His fifth string quartet, the 'Lemming' (1970), ushered in his new chapter of post-expressionistic writing of the 1960s. This composition approach proved to be a quick way of writing large blocks of sound (the temporal order of events being left to the performer) and permitted an exceptionally prolific output. Instead of constituting individual works, his music is more like a musical stream of consciousness (under the headings of Thoughts, Episode and Orchestral Diary Sheet). It also means that there are numerous scorings of the same piece. This method was first used in his 5th String Quartet, the "Lemming Quartet".

Among Segerstam's juvenilia (1960–1969) are four string quartets from 1962–1966, and the post-impressionist ballet Pandora from 1967. The quartets are usually labeled as from his "Post-Expressionist" period.

In 2015 Segerstam began work on an opera, Völvan, with a libretto by Elisabeth Wärnfeldt.

Personal life
He was married to the violinist  (concertmaster of the Finnish RSO), with whom he had two children, Jan and Pia. Pia is a professional cellist; Jan is a businessman. After Segerstam's divorce from Hannele, he married the Helsinki Philharmonic harpist Minnaleena Jankko in 2002, with whom he had three children: Violaelina (born 1997), Selimoskar (born 1998) and Iirisilona (born 1999). In 2009, it was announced that their marriage would end.

Works

344 symphonies
30 string quartets
13 violin concertos
8 cello concertos
4 viola concertos
4 piano concertos

Awards
In 1962, he won the Maj Lind Piano Competition. In 1999, he was awarded the Nordic Council Music Prize for his work as a "tireless champion of Scandinavian Music". In spring 2003, he received Svenska Kulturfonden’s prize for his meritorious action in the field of music. In 2014, the President of Finland granted Segerstam the title of Professor and he was awarded the annual State Prize for Music in Finland. In 2005, he was awarded the highly esteemed Sibelius Medal.

Selected discography 
This is a list of selected orchestral recordings conducted by Segerstam.

References

External links 
 

1944 births
Living people
Finnish classical composers
21st-century classical composers
Finnish conductors (music)
Swedish-speaking Finns
Sibelius Academy alumni
Academic staff of Sibelius Academy
Finnish male classical composers
Finnish violists
21st-century conductors (music)
21st-century male musicians
People from Vaasa
21st-century Finnish composers
21st-century violists